Megacraspedus calamogonus is a moth of the family Gelechiidae. It was described by Edward Meyrick in 1885. It is endemic to New Zealand. 

The forewings are whitish-ochreous, with the veins sometimes slightly infuscated. There is a dark fuscous dot in the disc slightly before the middle, a second very obliquely before it on the fold, and a third in the disc at two-thirds. There is also a short fuscous apical streak. The hindwings are whitish.

Larvae of this species feed on the flowers and seeds of grass and sedge plants. Hosts include Austroderia richardii, Chionochloa flavescens, Chionochloa macra, Chionochloa pallens, Chionochloa rigida and Chionochloa rubra.

References

Moths described in 1885
Megacraspedus
Moths of New Zealand
Endemic fauna of New Zealand
Taxa named by Edward Meyrick
Endemic moths of New Zealand